Harshvardhan Singh Dungarpur (born 6 June 1956) is an Indian politician. He is a Rajya Sabha member from Rajasthan belonging to the Bharatiya Janata Party.

References

1956 births
Living people
Rajya Sabha members from Rajasthan
People from Dungarpur
Bharatiya Janata Party politicians from Rajasthan
Rajasthani people
Rajya Sabha members from the Bharatiya Janata Party